Henry Matthew Adam FRSE (11 May 1911 – 18 June 2004) was a British physician and pharmacologist. Earlier known for research on chemical and biological warfare, he is now mainly remembered for his research on histamines and their role in the body, especially its role in digestion.

Early life and education
He was born in London on 11 May 1911. At this time his parents were on route from Moscow to Rome and he spent his childhood in numerous European cities including Rome, Manchester and Madrid. From 1926 the family settled in Edinburgh and there he attended George Watson's College.

He studied medicine at Edinburgh University, graduating MB ChB in 1935. He then began doing postgraduate research at the university.

Career 
During World War II, he served with the Royal Army Medical Corps. In 1942 he was moved to do chemical research at Porton Down, but was seconded to the Scientific Inteklligence section of the US Army late in 1944 and was one of the scientific officers first entering the Buchenwald concentration camp in 1945. In this exercise he was to "rescue" (from the Russians) and interview the German scientists who had been working on the artificial infection of the typhus virus through selected prisoners.

After the war he began lecturing in Pharmacology at Edinburgh University under Sir John Gaddum. He declined various offers of professorship in England and the United States, preferring to stay in Edinburgh, but was never offered a professorship there.

In 1954 he was elected a Fellow of the Royal Society of Edinburgh.

Adam was also the longtime editor of the British Journal of Pharmacology.

Personal life

In 1940, he married biologist/zoologist Katherine Mary Galbraith Fleming. He died from colon cancer on 18 June 2004.

References

1911 births
2004 deaths
Alumni of the University of Edinburgh Medical School
British pharmacologists
Fellows of the Royal Society of Edinburgh
British Army personnel of World War II
Royal Army Medical Corps officers
Deaths from colorectal cancer
Deaths from cancer in the United Kingdom
Military personnel from London